Sudhanshu Rai is an Indian film director, actor and storyteller. He is mainly known for, web series Detective Boomrah and film Chaipatti.

Early life 
Rai was born in Gorakhpur. He pursued his MBA from IBS, Bangalore in 2008.

Career

As a filmmaker 
Rai made his acting and directorial debut in 2021 with Chaipatti, which was premiered on YouTube and subsequently released on OTT platforms Disney+ Hotstar and MX Player. A year later in 2022, he released his first web series Detective Boomrah wherein he was the director and also the lead actor.

As a storyteller 
He began conceiving and narrating stories in 2018 on his official YouTube channel "Kahanikaar Sudhanshu Rai" and in 2020, he started his weekly radio storytelling show, "Kahaniyaan - Kahanikaar Sudhanshu Rai Ke Saath" on ISHQ 104.8 FM. It was during the initial storytelling days that he created the character of "Detective Boomrah", which is now a web series.

Filmography

Radio show 
 Kahaniyaan Kahanikaar Sudhanshu Rai Ke Saath (12 episodes))

Character 
Detective Boomrah

Stories 
The Christmas Man
The Killer 
Bhai Sahab Chale Bangkok
The Prisoner
Adhyapak Ram
Mangu Chitrakaar 
Holi Wala Dost

References 

Indian film directors
Indian storytellers
Living people
Indian actors
Year of birth missing (living people)